The 2021 HFX Wanderers FC season was the third season in the club's history, as well as the third season in Canadian Premier League history.

Current squad

Transfers

In

Draft picks 
HFX Wanderers selected the following players in the 2021 CPL–U Sports Draft on January 29, 2021. Draft picks are not automatically signed to the team roster. Only those who are signed to a contract will be listed as transfers in.

Out

Competitions

Canadian Premier League

Table

Results by match

Matches

Canadian Championship

Preliminary round

Quarter-finals

Statistics

Players

Goalkeepers

References

External links 
2021 HFX Wanderers FC season at Official Site

2021
2021 Canadian Premier League
Canadian soccer clubs 2021 season
2021 in Nova Scotia